The Kettles in the Ozarks is a 1956 American comedy film directed by Charles Lamont. It is the ninth installment of Universal-International's Ma and Pa Kettle series starring Marjorie Main and introducing Arthur Hunnicutt as Sedge, Pa's brother who lives in the Ozarks, replacing Percy Kilbride as Pa.

Plot
With Pa out of the way, Ma and the kids head out to help Pa's brother Sedgewick with his farm in Mournful Hollow, Arkansas. Ma and 13 of her 16 kids waste no time in turning both the train station waiting room and the train's day coach into a complete shambles.

Upon arrival, Ma discovers Sedgwick is at least as lazy as Pa, if not worse. And he's been keeping his fiancé Bedelia waiting for 20 years to marry him. Ma is determined to nudge Sedgwick towards the altar.

Sedgwick is renting out his barn to three men who have "Gangster" written all over them; and they are working an illegal moonshine liquor still in the barn. Disposing of the waste product from the still proves problematic. Every time the crooks go into the woods, they have problems with Mother Nature (bears, a hornet's nest, etc.).

When they dispose of the waste at the farm itself, it seeps into the groundwater. The result is a barnyard full of very tipsy animals.

Ma tricks the gangsters into taking part in a taffy pull contest. The taffy dough has been liberally spiked with glue, and the criminals' hands are trapped tight until the authorities come to arrest them.

Sedgwick and Bedelia are married, despite the minister's lips being accidentally glued shut when he tries the tainted taffy.

Cast
Marjorie Main as Ma Kettle
Arthur Hunnicutt as Sedgewick Kettle
Una Merkel as Miss Bedelia Baines
Ted de Corsia as Professor
Olive Sturgess as Nancy Kettle
Richard Eyer as Billy Kettle
Cheryl Callaway as Suzie Kettle
Paul Wexler as Reverend Martin
Richard Deacon as "Big Trout", The Indian
Pat Goldin as "Small Fry", The Indian
Sid Tomack as Benny
Joe Sawyer as Bancroft Baines, Bedelia's Brother
Bonnie Franklin as Betty Kettle

See also
List of American films of 1956

References

External links

1956 films
1956 comedy films
Films directed by Charles Lamont
American black-and-white films
Films set in Arkansas
Universal Pictures films
Ma and Pa Kettle
Films set in Washington (state)
1950s English-language films
American comedy films